Cameron Mica Boyce (May 28, 1999 – July 6, 2019) was an American actor. He began his career as a child actor, appearing in the 2008 films Mirrors and Eagle Eye, along with the comedy film Grown Ups (2010) and its 2013 sequel. His first starring role was on the Disney Channel comedy series Jessie (2011–2015).

Continuing to work with Disney, Boyce achieved further prominence as Carlos, one of the title characters in the musical fantasy Descendants film franchise. He appeared in all three television films from 2015 to 2019, in addition to various spin-off media. He also starred in the titular role of Jake in the second and third seasons of the Disney Junior series Jake and the Never Land Pirates (2012–2014). Boyce was featured as the lead of Disney XD comedy series Gamer's Guide to Pretty Much Everything (2015–2017).

Ahead of the Descendants 3 premiere in 2019, Boyce died at the age of 20 due to complications from epilepsy. Posthumously, he headlined the thriller film Runt (2020) and was a series regular on the Amazon Prime Video supernatural thriller Paradise City (2021).

Early and personal life 

Boyce was born in Los Angeles, California, on May 28, 1999. Boyce was born to an African-American father, Victor Boyce and a Jewish mother, Libby Boyce. His paternal grandmother, Jo Ann Boyce (née Allen), was one of the Clinton Twelve, the first African-Americans to attend an integrated high school in the Southern United States, in 1956, as ordered by Brown v. Board of Education. His paternal grandfather was from the Caribbean.

Boyce lived in the Los Angeles area with his parents and his younger sister, until he moved in with former co-stars Karan Brar and Sophie Reynolds in May 2019. He was trained in breakdancing, hip-hop, modern dance, jazz, tap dance, and ballet. His favorite style was breakdancing, and, along with four of his friends, he was a member of the breakdancing crew "X Mob".

Career 

In May 2008, Boyce made his debut as a child actor in the music video "That Green Gentleman (Things Have Changed)", appearing as a younger version of Panic! at the Disco guitarist Ryan Ross. In July 2008, he appeared in General Hospital: Night Shift as a recurring character named Michael. In August 2008, he made his feature film debut with a starring role in the horror film Mirrors, as well as appearing in the mystery-thriller film Eagle Eye that fall.

In June 2010, Boyce starred as Keith, the spoiled son of Adam Sandler's character, in the comedy film Grown Ups and appeared later that same year showing off his dance skills on the web series The Legion of Extraordinary Dancers.

In April 2011, Boyce made a guest appearance on Disney Channel's comedy series Good Luck Charlie, and later that month he was one of the featured dancers in a royal wedding tribute on ABC's Dancing with the Stars. In June 2011, he had a small role as one of Judy's classmates in the family comedy film Judy Moody and the Not Bummer Summer. In August 2011, he was one of the featured dancers on Disney Channel's comedy series Shake It Up. In September 2011, Boyce was cast in the starring role of Luke Ross on Disney Channel's comedy series Jessie. During pre-production of the series, the role of Luke was originally intended to be a boy named Hiro adopted from Korea, but casting directors were impressed with Boyce during the audition process and ultimately decided to recreate the role specifically for him.

In 2015, Boyce was one of the main cast members in Disney Channel's Descendants, playing Carlos, the son of Cruella de Vil. He later reprised the character for the animated shorts Descendants: Wicked World and in the sequels Descendants 2 and Descendants 3, the latter of which was released posthumously.

In March 2018, Boyce was cast in the ABC comedy television pilot Steps, in the role of Becker, and was also cast in the indie film Runt, in the role of Cal.

In January 2019, Boyce had joined the cast of HBO's Mrs. Fletcher. In April 2019, Boyce performed in the music video for "Almost (Sweet Music)" by Hozier. He choreographed the dance with dancer Christine Flores, who appeared in the video alongside him. In September 2019, it was announced that his clothing line called Archives, co-founded by him and stylist and designer Veronica Graye, would be released in November 2019.

On July 14, 2020, a year after Boyce's death, the Alex Winter-directed documentary Showbiz Kids debuted on HBO. The film, which is about childhood stardom and its effects, includes interview footage of Boyce. It is dedicated to the memory of Boyce and former child actress Diana Serra Cary who had died on February 24, 2020. Just prior to his death, Boyce was to begin production with Sandler on a new project. The project he was due to star in with Sandler, Hubie Halloween, was released on October 7, 2020, with a dedication to Boyce that read, "In loving memory of Cameron Boyce. Gone way too soon and one of the kindest, coolest, funniest, and most talented kids we knew. You live on forever in our hearts and are truly missed everyday."

Death 
On July 6, 2019, Boyce, aged 20, was found unresponsive at his home in Los Angeles, California. Authorities were called, and he was pronounced dead at the scene. According to a statement made by Boyce's family, Boyce died in his sleep "due to a seizure which was a result of an ongoing medical condition for which he was being treated". An autopsy was performed, but release of a cause of death was deferred pending further investigation. On July 9, 2019, Boyce's family confirmed that his death was caused by an epileptic seizure and that Boyce was previously diagnosed with epilepsy. The autopsy results were released by the Los Angeles County Department of Medical Examiner-Coroner on July 30, 2019, confirming Boyce's cause of death was due to sudden unexpected death in epilepsy. His body was cremated, and his ashes were returned to his family.

Philanthropy and legacy 
In the span of 40 days in 2017, Boyce helped raise over $27,000 for the Thirst Project, which helps bring clean water to underdeveloped countries. In September 2019, Thirst Project officially changed the name of the Pioneering Spirit Award to the Cameron Boyce Pioneering Spirit Award, to honor his work with the organization.

He also supported United Way of America's initiative to end homelessness. He helped raise money for the HomeWalk in 2015, and continued to do so up until the end of his life. In May 2019, he participated in the opening ceremony of the 12th annual HomeWalk in downtown Los Angeles, one of the largest public events to end homelessness in the United States.

Boyce also worked closely with It's On Us, a social movement created to raise awareness and fight against sexual assault on college campuses for both men and women.

He also worked with the Lucstrong Foundation, which provides grants to families with children who are diagnosed with sickle cell disease and are going through the bone marrow transplant process.

His final humanitarian project was called Wielding Peace, a social media campaign in conjunction with Delaney Tarr, co-founder of March for Our Lives. In Boyce's own words, the campaign would "help fight against gun violence by showing celebrities and survivors 'wielding' a new kind of weapon — one of unity."

The Cameron Boyce Foundation 
Following Boyce's death in 2019, The Cameron Boyce Foundation, a nonprofit organization, was founded in Los Angeles through Network for Good that provides young people artistic and creative outlets as alternatives to violence and negativity and uses resources and philanthropy for positive change in the world.

On July 25, 2019, the foundation disclosed the first project to be carried out was Wielding Peace, which officially launched on August 16, 2019. The foundation later donated $8,000 to Thirst Project to build a well in Uganda.

Filmography

Film

Television

Video games and web series

Awards and nominations

References

External links 

 
 
 
 

1999 births
2019 deaths
21st-century American Jews
21st-century American male actors
African-American Jews
African-American male actors
African-American male child actors
American male child actors
American male film actors
American male television actors
American male voice actors
Daytime Emmy Award winners
Deaths from epilepsy
Jewish American male actors
Jewish American philanthropists
Male actors from Los Angeles
Neurological disease deaths in California
Philanthropists from California